The  is an  or  (painted narrative handscroll) from the beginning of the 13th century, in the Kamakura period of Japanese history (1185–1333).

Background

Originating in Japan in the sixth or seventh century through trade with the Chinese Empire,  art spread widely among the aristocracy in the Heian period. An  consists of one or more long rolls of paper narrating a story through  texts and paintings.

The narrative of an  assumes a series of scenes, the rhythm, composition and transitions of which are entirely the artist's sensitivity and technique. The themes of the stories were very varied: illustrations of novels, historical chronicles, religious texts, biographies of famous people, humorous or fantastic anecdotes, etc.

The Kamakura period, the advent of which followed a period of political turmoil and civil wars, was marked by the coming to power of the warrior class (the samurai). Under the impetus of the new warrior class in power,  evolved towards a more realistic and composite pictorial style.

Description

The majority of studies of the work focus on the  version, which is recognised as a National Treasure of Japan.

The narrative of the  version is divided into four unequal parts. Subsequently, the victim of a conspiracy orchestrated by Fujiwara no Tokihira, he was wrongly convicted and died in exile. From the start, he was credited with a divine origin, for he "appeared" as a child in his father's garden; the divine child remains a popular myth of Buddhism, referring to the historical Buddha. Later, his intellectual as well as physical capacities were emphasised, for example through the composition of poems or participation in archery. He died in 903.

In the second part of the  version, the vengeful ghost of  returns to earth after his death to torment the actors of the conspiracy, in the form of a god of thunder. Several incidents occur in the years following his death, in particular fires in the capital (Kyōto) and the deaths of his opponents; these misdeeds are swiftly attributed to the spirit of Michizane. More precisely, a priest named  describes having conversed with him while he crossed the six realms of existence, notably the underworld, before returning from the afterlife. Contrary to the original story, 's journey is recounted in detail, in a fantastic, even Dantesque way.

Finally, the last part relates various miracles related to the temple.

The narrative and context of the time suggest that the original work was created for spiritual purposes. The  Buddhist school is particularly highlighted in it, so much so that the paintings probably had a didactic value, serving as a support for the teaching or the recitation of Buddhist legends. Sessions of explanation of religious paintings were common in the Kamakura period. In addition, any such didactic aspect would also explain the unusually large height of the scroll and the large number of versions. The esoteric beliefs of the time may also suggest that its function was to appease tormented spirits.

Dating, author and sponsor

Apart from an abandoned theory which attributed the  version to Fujiwara no Nobuzane, no clues about the artist of the  version have survived.

 donated the  version to the  shrine, probably to strengthen the political position of the Kujō family in the early 13th century (an unstable period).

Style and composition

The composition also plays on the differences of scale, as in the often depicted scene of the prayer of Michizane atop a mountain: he is shown is overly large to represent his strength of character, despite a humble posture that makes him an "allegorical figure of man". Realistic art characteristic of the Kamakura period is also displayed in the scenes of movement, such as the jostling or fleeing of a character.

The latter also notes in places the nervousness of the features, similar to the Song dynasty wash technique characteristic of Zen Buddhism.

However, Buddhist iconography remains heavily used, whether through the narration of the life of Michizane, modelled on the life of the historical Buddha, or the presence of Buddhist creatures, or the illustration of the six realms of existence.

Historiographical value

Besides its historical and religious content, the  offers insight into everyday life, not of the time of Michizane, but of that of the artist 300 years later. The latter painted, for example, various rites and birth ceremonies or the outfits of young monks in the temples.

A scene from the first part of the work shows a boat propelled by six rowers, testimony of medieval Japanese ships of which no example remains.

More generally, the architecture of the characters' habitats, their internal layout, the clothes, the festivities, the wooden bridges, the graves, the pets, the children who appear very frequently, and a multitude of other details are revealed by a study of the work by the Kanagawa University.

Legacy

From the point of view of the narrative, the various versions are generally divided into three branches, according to the introductory sentence in each version:

See also
List of National Treasures of Japan (paintings)
National Treasure (Japan)

References

Notes

Bibliography

External links

Emakimono
National Treasures of Japan